The following notable people were born in, residents of, attended an education institution in, or otherwise closely associated with the city of Chula Vista, California. Notation next to name is not what they are notable for, but how they are connected to the city.

Business

 Corky McMillin - resided in Chula Vista in 1944 prior to moving to Bonita
 Brent R. Wilkes - grew up in Chula Vista; entrepreneur, defense contractor, civic leader and philanthropist

Crime

 John Ronald Brown - surgeon who was convicted of second-degree murder; lived in Chula Vista while practicing medicine in Tijuana, Baja California, Mexico
Richard "Cheeks" Buchanan - Mexican Mafia member; originally from Chula Vista's Otay neighborhood
 Andrew Cunanan - murderer of Gianni Versace; attended Bonita Vista Middle School
 Robert Alton Harris - murderer who was executed by gas; resided in Chula Vista with his father during his late teen years
Jose Alberto "Bat" Marquez - Mexican Mafia member; resided in Chula Vista's Castle Park neighborhood for a period of time
Larry Millete - suspect in the disappearance of his wife, Maya Millete
Christopher George "Chris Petti" Poulos - Chula Vista resident and Chicago Outfit associate who ran a mafia crew out of San Diego. The FBI jokingly dubbed him "The Rodney Dangerfield" of the mafia.

Entertainment

Actors and actresses

 Charisma Carpenter - attended Bonita Vista High School, graduated from Chula Vista High School, class of 1988
 Grey DeLisle - graduated from Chula Vista High School, class of 1991
 Rita Hayworth - lived in Chula Vista in the 1930s
 Walter Emanuel Jones - attended Chula Vista High School
 Mario Lopez - graduated from Chula Vista High School, class of 1991
 Sean Murray - graduated from Bonita Vista Middle School
 Jenna Presley - graduated from Hilltop High School, class of 2005
 Carmen Serano - born in Chula Vista
 Johnny Sheffield - lived and died in Chula Vista

Bands
 Some Girls - San Diego hardcore collective that included Chula Vista natives Sal Gallegos III (drums) and Rob Moran (guitar)
 Unbroken - San Diego hardcore band co-formed by Chula Vista native Rob Moran (bass); Unbroken was closely associated with the Chula Vista hardcore punk scene
 The Zeros - punk band formed in Chula Vista
 Ati's Warriors - funk-punk fusion band formed in Chula Vista after the breakup of Unbroken, includes Chula Vista natives Atilla Moran (vocals) and Rob Moran (Keytar)

Comedians

 Mary Castillo - graduated from Chula Vista High School, class of 1992
 Gabriel Iglesias - spent early childhood in Chula Vista

Models

Raquel Pomplun - Playboy's 2013 Playmate of the Year, Chula Vista native and Southwestern College alum

Musicians

 Matt Cameron - drummer for Soundgarden and Pearl Jam, attended Bonita Vista High School
 Ilan Rubin - drummer for Nine Inch Nails and Angels & Airwaves, drummed on Paramore self-titled Grammy-winning album, is the youngest member to be inaugurated into the Rock and Roll Hall of Fame, went to Bonita Vista Middle School & Bonita Vista High School.
 Marcos Curiel - guitarist for P.O.D. and The Accident Experiment; Chula Vista native, and graduated from Bonita Vista High School, class of 1992
Gonjasufi - Chula Vista native
 Robert Lopez - guitarist for The Zeros, man behind stage persona of El Vez, attended Chula Vista High School
 Jessica Sanchez - second place on American Idol, season 11
 Julieta Venegas - attended Southwestern College
 Tom Waits - graduated from Hilltop High School

Wrestlers

 Konnan - resides in Eastlake, Chula Vista
 Rey Mysterio Jr. - born in Chula Vista

Writers

 Costa Dillon - graduated from Bonita Vista High School
 J. Michael Straczynski - attended Southwestern College
 Joan D. Vinge - graduated from Hilltop High School, class of 1965

Government

Criminal justice
A. J. Irwin - grew up in Chula Vista; former federal agent

Military
 John William Finn - Medal of Honor recipient, lived in the Veterans Home of Chula Vista for a short period of time before his death
 John J. McGinty - Medal of Honor recipient, resides in Chula Vista

Politics
 Brian Bilbray - attended Southwestern College, 1970–1974
 Cheryl Cox - graduated from Hilltop High School, class of 1966; Mayor of Chula Vista
 Bob Filner - former Representative of California's 51st congressional district, 35th Mayor of San Diego
 Kyle Foggo - graduated from Hilltop High School, former executive director of the Central Intelligence Agency 
Shirley Horton - attended Bonita Vista High School
 Nick Popaditch - Chula Vista resident; Congressional candidate
 Mary Salas - Chula Vista Mayor (2013–2022)
 Ur Jaddou - 6th Director of the United States Citizenship and Immigration Services
 Steve Padilla - California State Senator
 Greg Cox - San Diego County Supervisor

Sports

Baseball

 Brian Barden - infielder, MLB and for Hiroshima Toyo Carp,  attended St. Pius Elementary School
 Marshall Boze - retired pitcher for Milwaukee Brewers, attended Southwestern College
 Calvin Faucher - pitcher for Tampa Bay Rays, born in Chula Vista, graduated from Hilltop High School
 Benji Gil - shortstop for Anaheim Angels, graduated from Castle Park High School, class of 1991
 Adrián González - first baseman for Los Angeles Dodgers, graduated from Eastlake High School, class of 2000
 Tommy Hinzo - retired second baseman for Cleveland Indians, graduated from Hilltop High School (class of 1982) and Southwestern College
 Mike Jacobs - first baseman for five MLB teams, born and raised in Chula Vista, graduated from Hilltop High School
 John Jaso - catcher for Pittsburgh Pirates, Tampa Bay Rays, born in Chula Vista
 John Tortes "Chief" Meyers - MLB catcher, lived in Chula Vista for a period in the 1930s
Marcelo Mayer - shortstop, fourth overall pick in the 2021 MLB Draft by the Boston Red Sox, graduated from Eastlake High School (class of 2021)
 Kevin Mitchell - former Major League Baseball outfielder, San Diego native who lived in Chula Vista
 Bob Natal - catcher, graduated from Hilltop High School, class of 1983
 Todd Pratt - catcher, attended Hilltop High School
 Carlos Quentin - outfielder for San Diego Padres and Chicago White Sox, raised in Chula Vista, attended St. Pius Elementary School
 Alfonso Rivas - First basemen and outfielder for the Chicago Cubs - resided in Chula Vista as a child after moving from Tijuana, Mexico
 Johnny Ritchey - First African American to play for the San Diego Padres (1948 - 1949), lived in Chula Vista after he retired from baseball
 Alex Sanabia - pitcher for the Los Angeles Angels of Anaheim, graduated from Castle Park High School
 Jose Silva - pitcher, MLB and for Dorados de Chihuahua, graduated from Hilltop High School, class of 1991
 Ty Wigginton - third baseman for eight MLB teams, graduated from Chula Vista High School, class of 1995
 Joel Zumaya - retired relief pitcher for Detroit Tigers and Minnesota Twins, born and raised in Chula Vista, graduated from Bonita Vista High School

Basketball
 Adrian Garcia Marquez - play-by-play announcer for the Los Angeles Lakers, raised in Chula Vista and attended Southwestern College

Football

 Donnie Edwards - linebacker, Chula Vista native, graduated from Chula Vista High School, class of 1991
 John Fox - Chicago Bears coach, graduated from Castle Park High School and attended Southwestern College
 Jerome Haywood - defensive tackle in the CFL, attended Castle Park High School
 Tony Jefferson - safety for the Arizona Cardinals, graduated from Eastlake High School, class of 2010
 Moses Moreno - quarterback, Chula Vista native, graduated from Castle Park High School
 Zeke Moreno - linebacker, Chula Vista native, graduated from Castle Park High School
 Jason Myers - kicker for the Jacksonville Jaguars, born in Chula Vista, attended Mater Dei
 Ogemdi Nwagbuo -  defensive tackle for the Carolina Panthers, attended Southwestern College
 Luis Perez - quarterback for Los Angeles Rams, attended Southwestern College
 Steve Riley - offensive tackle, born and raised in Chula Vista, attended Castle Park High School
 Scott Shields - safety, graduated from Bonita Vista High School

Golf

 Billy Casper - graduated from Chula Vista High School, class of 1950

Hockey
Craig Coxe - born in Chula Vista

Horse racing
 Charles E. Whittingham - Hall of Fame trainer, born in Chula Vista
David E. Rushlow - Jockey

Mixed martial arts
 Dominick Cruz - resides in Chula Vista
 Shannon Gugerty - Chula Vista native, graduated from Hilltop High School
 Dean Lister - graduated from Hilltop High School, class of 1994
 Waachiim Spiritwolf - attended Hilltop High School
 Brandon Vera - resides in Chula Vista

Soccer

 Charles Adair - forward, graduated from Hilltop High School, class of 1989
 Jennifer Lalor - midfielder, born in Chula Vista, graduated from Bonita Vista High School
 Cesar Romero - forward for Chivas USA, graduated from Otay Ranch High School
Paul Arriola - midfielder for D.C. United

Track and field

 Tim Danielson - attended Chula Vista High School
 Desiree Davila - attended Hilltop High School in Chula Vista

Other
 Hector X. "Shipwreck" Delgado - born in Chula Vista; a fictional character from the G.I. Joe: A Real American Hero toy line, cartoon series, and comic books
 M. Brian Maple - physicist at UCSD, born in Chula Vista
 John Rojas, Jr. -  historian, founded Chula Vista Historical Society (which later merged with Chula Vista Heritage Museum)
 Wolfman Jack - radio personality who broadcast out of XERB in Chula Vista during the 1960s

References

Chula Vista
Chula Vista